Ken Hyland is a British linguist. He is currently a professor of applied linguistics in education at the University of East Anglia.

Hyland is an applied linguist in the field of academic discourse, second language writing, and English for Academic Purposes, and has published more than 26 books and 200 articles. Google Scholar shows him to be one of the most cited researchers in Applied Linguistics.

Career
He is founding co-editor of the Journal of English for Academic Purposes and was co-editor of Applied Linguistics.

Books

Authored 
 Hyland, K. (2016) Teaching and Researching Writing. 3rd edition. London: Routledge.
 Hyland, K. (2015) Academic publishing: issues and challenges in the production of knowledge. Oxford: Oxford University Press.
 Hyland, K. (2015). Academic Written English. Shanghai: Shanghai Foreign Language Education Press.
 Hyland, K. (2012). Disciplinary Identities: Individuality and Community in Academic Writing. Cambridge: Cambridge Applied Linguistics.
 Hyland, K. (2009). Teaching and Researching Writing. 2nd edition. London: Longman.
 Hyland, K. (2009). Academic Discourse: English in a Global Context. London: Continuum.
 Hyland, K. (2006). English for Academic Purposes: An Advanced Resource Book. London: Routledge.
 Hyland, K. (2005). Metadiscourse: Exploring Interaction in Writing. London: Continuum.
 Hyland, K. (2004). Genre and Second Language Writing. Ann Arbor: University of Michigan Press.
 Hyland, K. (2004). Disciplinary Discourses: Social Interactions in Academic Writing. Ann Arbor: University of Michigan Press.
 Hyland, K. (2003). Second Language Writing. New York: Cambridge University Press. [Awarded Honorable Mention for the Kenneth W. Mildenberger Prize, Modern Languages Association]. 
 Hyland, K. (2002). Teaching and Researching Writing. London: Longman.
 Hyland, K. (2000). Disciplinary Discourses: Social Interactions in Academic Writing. London: Longman
 Hyland, K. (1998). Hedging in Scientific Research Articles. Amsterdam: John Benjamins.

Edited 
 Hyland, K. (ed.) (2017). The Essential Hyland. London: Bloomsbury Press.
 Wong, L. & Hyland, K. (eds.) (2017). Faces of English Education: Students, Teachers and Pedagogy. London: Routledge. 
 Hyland, K. (ed.) (2017). Academic Writing: critical readings vol 1–2. London: Bloomsbury Press.
 Hyland, K & Shaw, P. (eds.) (2016). The Routledge Handbook of English for Academic Purposes. London: Routledge.
 Hyland, K. & Wong, L. (Eds.) Innovation and Change in Language Education. London: Routledge.
 Hyland, K. (Ed.) (2013). Discourse Studies Reader. London: Bloomsbury Publishing.
 Hyland, K. & Sancho Guinda, C. (Eds.) (2013).  Stance and Voice in Written Academic Genres. London: Palgrave Macmillan.
 Hyland, K., Chau M. H. & Handford, M. (Eds.) (2012). Corpus Applications in Applied Linguistics. London: Continuum.
 Hyland, K & Paltridge, B. (Eds.) (2011). Continuum Companion to Discourse Analysis. London: Continuum.
 Hyland, K. & Diani, G. (Eds.) (2009). Academic Evaluation: Review Genres in University Setting. London: Palgrave-MacMillan.
 Hyland, K. & Bondi, M. (Eds.) (2006). Academic Discourse Across Disciplines. Frankfort: Peter Lang.
 Hyland, K. & Hyland, F. (Eds.) (2006). Feedback in Second Language Writing: Contexts and Issues. New York: Cambridge University Press.
 Candlin, C. & Hyland, K. (Eds.) (1999). Writing: Texts, Processes and Practice. London: Longman.
 Berry, R., Asker, B., Hyland, K. & Lam, M. (Eds.) (1999). Language Analysis, Description and Pedagogy. Hong Kong: Hong Kong University of Science and Technology Press.

See also 
 Second language writing
 Paul Kei Matsuda
 Rosa Manchón

References 

1951 births
Living people
Linguists from the United Kingdom
Applied linguists
Second language writing
Academic staff of the University of Hong Kong
Academics of the University of London
Academics of the University of East Anglia